I Zwicky 36, often abbreviated to I Zw 36, is a galaxy in the constellation of Canes Venatici. It is located at a distance of about 5.8 megaparsecs from the Milky Way.

I Zwicky 36 is an irregular galaxy, specifically a blue compact dwarf galaxy. These galaxies are small, and have high rates of star formation, making them appear bluish in color. The dominant population of stars in I Zw 36 is young in stellar terms, with ages of under 3 million years. It is quite isolated: the nearest galaxy is Messier 94 (NGC 4736) which is about 1.4 megaparsecs away, although the galaxy may have experienced a merger in the past that could explain its current burst of star formation.

References

Canes Venatici
Dwarf galaxies
UGCA objects